7 is the second extended play (EP) and major label debut by American rapper and singer Lil Nas X. The EP was released on June 21, 2019, by Columbia Records. It was preceded by the Billboard Hot 100 number one single "Old Town Road" (both the original version and Billy Ray Cyrus remix), "Panini", and "Rodeo". The extended play features guest appearances from Cyrus, Travis Barker, and Cardi B. Despite receiving a mixed reception from critics, 7 received six Grammy Award nominations, including a nomination for Album of the Year. At under 19 minutes, it is the shortest release to be nominated for the award in Grammy Award history.

Background
While recording the album Lil Nas X deliberately avoided producing an album full of country rap songs, not wanting to be pigeonholed by the success of "Old Town Road". Despite this, he would include one other country song, "Rodeo", only after producers Take a Daytrip earned his trust by giving him the beat for "Panini". Several trap beats were also sent to the singer for consideration, which he rejected as he did not want to be a "trap artist".

While in the process of recording the songs Lil Nas X posted previews of both "Panini" and "Rodeo" to his social media accounts before either song were completely written. This caused some problems for producers Take a Daytrip as the popularity of these snippets meant that much of the work had to be "locked in" so the resulting songs would match the previews.

Lil Nas X announced the 7 EP on May 18, 2019, on all social media platforms along with its June 2019 release date. This teaser included the snippet of a song described by Spins Rob Arcand as "singing a trap-pop hook through a slurred AutoTune drawl". Lil Nas X stated that the EP would include a collaboration with "one of [his] favorite artists ever".

Singles
"Old Town Road" was released as the lead single from the EP on December 3, 2018, peaking at the top of the US Billboard Hot 100. A remix featuring Billy Ray Cyrus was released as a single on April 5, 2019, spending a record 19 weeks at the top. 

"Panini" was released as the third single from the EP on June 20, 2019, the day before the EP was released, and would peak at number five on the Hot 100.

"Rodeo", originally with Cardi B, was not made a single until a remix featuring Nas was released on January 27, 2020, one day after it was performed at the Grammys. The remix was used for the music video in which Nas makes an appearance.

Critical reception

7 received mixed reviews from critics. At Metacritic, which assigns a normalized rating out of 100 to reviews from mainstream publications, 7 received an average score of 57, based on 11 reviews, indicating "mixed or average reviews".

Mikael Wood at the Los Angeles Times considered it among the best debut efforts of the year, calling the songs on 7 "vivid, funny, full of feeling and supremely catchy, even if they don't quite offer a clear picture of who Lil Nas X is offstage or off-screen." Brittany Spanos, writing for Rolling Stone praised the EP's "carefully balanced earnestness and playfulness," but agreed with Wood: "Still, it leaves more questions than answers about what and who Lil Nas X wants to be." In a mixed review, Garrett Gravley at Consequence of Sound described the EP as a "musical Chex Mix — lightweight and best consumed in selective increments, but also strangely addictive."

Other reviews were more negative. Brian Josephs at Entertainment Weekly criticized its "failed versatility", summarizing by saying, "With 7, there's too little conviction to tell if a full project is something Lil Nas X wants to do. At best, there's a set of half-considered songs." Alphonse Pierre gave it a poor review for Pitchfork, commenting, "For the entirety of 7, it's unclear if Lil Nas X actually likes music [...] The EP ends up being a set of nothingness [...] content made for the sake of justifying its existence."

Accolades

Commercial performance
7 debuted at number two on the US Billboard 200 with 77,000 album-equivalent units (including 4,000 pure album sales). In its second week the EP remained at number two on Billboard 200 with 62,800 units.

Track listing
Adapted from Tidal.

Notes
  signifies a miscellaneous producer
  signifies an uncredited producer

Samples
  "Old Town Road (Remix)" and "Old Town Road" contain a sample of "34 Ghosts IV", written by Trent Reznor and Atticus Ross, and performed by Nine Inch Nails.
  "Panini" contains an interpolation of "In Bloom", written by Kurt Cobain, and performed by Nirvana.

Personnel
Credits adapted from Tidal.

Musicians

 Lil Nas X – lead vocals, production 
 Cardi B – lead vocals 
 Billy Ray Cyrus – featured vocals 
 Jocelyn "Jozzy" Donald – background vocals 
 Ryan Tedder – background vocals , production , bass , drums , guitar 
 Zach Skelton – background vocals , production , bass , drums , electric guitar 
 YoungKio – production 
 Atticus Ross – production 
 Trent Reznor – background vocals, production 
 Take a Daytrip – production 
 Travis Barker – production 
 Bizness Boi – production 
 fwdslxsh – production 
 Alone In A Boy Band – production 
 Roy Lenzo – production 
 Russ Chell – production 
 Boi-1da – production 
 Allen Ritter – production 
 Dot da Genius – co-production 
 Abaz – miscellaneous production 
 X-Plosive – miscellaneous production 
 Jahaan Sweet – miscellaneous production 
 Stephen "Johan" Feigenbaum – strings 
 Yasmeen Al-Mazeedi – violin 
 Eddie Benjamin – bass 
 Danny Win – saxophone

Technical

 Andrew "VoxGod" Bolooki – vocal production, mixing 
 Joe Grasso – engineering 
 Thomas Cullison – assistant engineering , recording 
 Andy Rodríguez – assistant engineering 
 Jeremie Inhaber – assistant engineering 
 Robin Florent – assistant engineering 
 Scott Desmarais – assistant engineering 
 Cinco – recording 
 Denzel Baptiste – recording 
 Matt Malpass – recording 
 Jordan "DJ Swivel" Young – mixing 
 Joe Grasso – mixing 
 Eric Lagg – mastering 
 Colin Leonard – mastering

Charts

Weekly charts

Year-end charts

Certifications

References

2019 debut EPs
Lil Nas X EPs
Albums produced by Atticus Ross
Albums produced by Boi-1da
Albums produced by Dot da Genius
Albums produced by Ryan Tedder
Albums produced by Travis Barker
Albums produced by Trent Reznor
Columbia Records EPs